Lars Göran Leonard Nilsson (born September 9, 1956) is a retired Swedish professional ice hockey player. He played for Västra Frölunda IF/HC and Malmö IF.

Career statistics

External links

1956 births
Frölunda HC players
Living people
Malmö Redhawks players
Swedish ice hockey defencemen